Johnny Messner (born April 11, 1970) is an American film and television actor best known for his portrayal of a muscular military man in the 2004 film Anacondas: The Hunt for the Blood Orchid.

Biography
Messner was born on April 11, 1970, in Syracuse, New York. He lived in Europe for 13 years while his father served in the United States Air Force, mainly in Germany and England. During this time, he developed a love for sports while playing on teams at military bases. He has one brother and one sister. He briefly attended the San Diego State University to major in sports broadcasting but eventually decided to drop out. Soon after that he went back to New York where he pursued an acting career. He has several tattoos; one depicts Italian actress Monica Bellucci, and another is of his father.

As an actor Messner is probably best known for his work in the films Tears of the Sun, The Whole Ten Yards and Hostage, and in the TV series Guiding Light (working with friend Frank Grillo and a young Hayden Panettiere), Law & Order: Special Victims Unit and Cold Case. In August 2004, American action adventure film Anacondas: The Hunt for the Blood Orchid, starring Messner as an ex-military man Bill Johnson, premiered in theaters. It was the actor's first leading role in a mainstream movie, and gave him a chance to impress the audiences with a perfect musculature. The portrayal gained him status of a sex symbol. Around that time Messner became notorious due to his controversial interviews for IGN and Lawrence Journal-World. He stated that "in Hollywood we've lost the real man", and that he's the only "alpha male" still working in the film industry, along with Bruce Willis. In those interviews Messner expressed harsh criticism for actors Orlando Bloom, Brad Pitt and Vin Diesel, among others. In December 2004, the horror-themed website CampBlood named him the 2004's sexiest man in horror.

Known as an action hero, he starred in numerous genre films including Anacondas: The Hunt for the Blood Orchid (2004), Tears of the Sun (2003), Running  Scared (2006), Arena (2011), Kill 'em All (2012), The Good, the Bad, and the Dead (2015), Silencer (2018), and Beyond the Law (2019). He portrayed the main protagonist, an ex-police officer Burke Wyatt, in the 2008 action film Ring of Death, created for Spike TV. A torture sequence, shot for the film, required Messner to be waterboarded.

Messner's partner is Kathryn Morris, whom he met while shooting Cold Case. They have twin sons.

Filmography

Film

Television

Awards and nominations

References

External links

1970 births
Living people
American male film actors
American male television actors
Male actors from Syracuse, New York